This is a list of notable people who are from Lethbridge, Alberta, Canada or have spent a large part or formative part of their career in that city. They are colloquially known as Lethbridgians.

Ernie Afaganis, CBC sports broadcaster
Richard Joseph Audet, flying ace during World War II
Conrad Bain, actor
Bob Bainborough, actor
Doug Barkley, hockey player
Roloff Beny, photographer
Rosella Bjornson, first female pilot for a commercial airline in North America
Bertram Brockhouse, Nobel Prize winner
Ronnie Burkett, puppeteer
Janet Cardiff, artist
Gavin Crawford, actor
Morgan Crooks, Olympic rower
Brandon Davidson, hockey player
Jason Day, mixed martial artist
Jack de Heer, hockey player
Kent Derricott, actor
Brad Erdos, gridiron football player
Joyce Fairbairn, Canadian senator
William Fruet, film and television writer and director
Mark Hartigan, played in the NHL for the Anaheim Ducks, Atlanta Thrashers, Columbus Blue Jackets, and Detroit Red Wings
Dar Heatherington, politician
David Hoffos, contemporary artist
Earl Ingarfield, Sr., hockey player
Athena Karkanis, actor
John Krizanc, playwright
Ernest George Mardon, educator and author
Cody Legebokoff, serial killer
Kari Matchett, actor
Bill Matheson, meteorologist
Anne-Marie Mediwake, broadcaster
Jordan Mein, mixed martial artist
Joseph Meli, four-time Canadian Olympian (Judo)
Cheryl Misak, philosopher
Ryland Moranz, musician
Tara-Jean Popowich, winner of So You Think You Can Dance Canada (Season 2)
Chris Pearson, first Premier of Yukon
Jamie Pushor, hockey player
Duncan Regehr, actor
Stacy Roest, hockey player
Chava Rosenfarb, author and Holocaust survivor
 John Andrew Roth (born 1942), CEO of Nortel
Gary Simmons hockey player
Linda Smith, novelist
Vern Smith, hockey player
Vic Stasiuk, hockey player
Richard Stevenson, poet
John Smith Stewart, soldier and politician
Theo Tams, winner of Canadian Idol Season 6 (2008)
Kris Versteeg, hockey player
Doug Vogt, photojournalist
Michael Wex, novelist and playwright
Max Wyman, 7th president of the University of Alberta (1969 - 1974)

See also
History of Lethbridge

 
Lethbridge
Lethbridge